Mass Appeal Madness is an EP by Napalm Death. It was released in 1991 on Earache Records and is dedicated to the memory of Roger Patterson, a member of the death metal band Atheist who died in the same year.

Track listing

The songs Unchallenged Hate and Social Sterility are different recordings than the versions found on From Enslavement to Obliteration

Credits
Mark "Barney" Greenway - lead vocals
Jesse Pintado - lead guitar
Mitch Harris - rhythm guitar
Shane Embury - bass
Mick Harris - drums, backing vocals

1991 EPs
Napalm Death EPs
Earache Records EPs